"Chantaje" (English: "Blackmail") is a song by Colombian singer-songwriter Shakira, featuring vocals by fellow Colombian singer Maluma. The song was released as a  single to anticipate Shakira's eleventh studio album El Dorado (2017) on 28 October 2016 by Sony Music Latin.  Its lyrics were written by Shakira and Maluma. Its musical composition was done by Shakira, Maluma, Kenai and The Rudeboyz. It was produced by Shakira, Maluma and The Rudeboyz. Maluma and Shakira previously collaborated on a remix of Carlos Vives' single "La Bicicleta".

"Chantaje" is a pop and reggaeton song. Lyrically, the song was considered a "battle of the sexes", where the male protagonist is not sure where he stands with his lover, and the female protagonist does not exactly clear things up. The music video for "Chantaje" was filmed in Barcelona, Spain, with video director Jaume de Laiguana, Shakira's long-time collaborator. Commercially, the song topped the Brazil, Ecuador, Guatemala, Spain, Uruguay, and US Billboard Latin Songs charts, while also reaching the top five in nine additional countries. It became the most successful Latin single of the decade by a female artist in the United States. The track is also certified Platinum or higher in ten countries, including Diamond in Argentina, Brazil (three times), France, Mexico and United States (Latin).

The song was nominated for Record of the Year, Song of the Year and Best Urban Fusion Performance at the 18th Latin Grammy Awards.

Background and release
Puerto Rican composer and recording artist Kenai had the word "Chantaje" in his mind months before the idea of a collaboration with Shakira and Maluma emerged. He stated in an interview that the idea of the song was intended to be his own single. While working on music demos in Colombia with The Rudeboyz, he received a call from the production duo to work on a collaborative single between Shakira and Maluma that was intended to be presented to the artists the next day. They were supposed to offer three different demos to Shakira and Maluma, but ended up working on just one feeling confident enough about its potential. The three worked together on the demo one night in Colombia. The Rudeboyz traveled without Kenai the next day to Barcelona, Spain to meet with Shakira and Maluma to keep working on the song together.

Before collaborating with Shakira in "Chantaje", Maluma served guest vocals for the official remix of Carlos Vives and Shakira's 2016 song "La Bicicleta". Later, Maluma travelled to Barcelona in early September 2016 to work with Shakira, along with his production team. He confessed to Billboard that "he couldn't miss the opportunity to work with [her] again." The pairing was possible due to Sony Music Latin, who proposed the idea for both artists working together again after the remix of "La Bicicleta". Maluma also commented about Shakira, stating: "It was an amazing experience. [...] She's a great artist, but she's also a composer. I learned a lot."

Before releasing the song, Shakira shared clues on her Instagram account on 25 October 2016, and if someone solved the mystery, they would get a personal message from the singer confirming the correct answer. The first photo had Shakira "wearing a magician's hat and holding a rabbit," which meant "Magic", name of both Shakira's and Maluma's first albums; the second photo had a drawing of a crown in a white board, meaning Maluma's crown tattoo; and the third photo was Shakira holding a poster with a photo of Alejandro Sanz (which stands for his nickname "Chan") + TA + G, which was the title of the track: "Chantaje". Later, the singer shared the artwork of the single, featuring both artists. Eventually, the song was released on 28 October 2016 through digital download by Ace Entertainment.

Composition
"Chantaje" was written by Shakira, Maluma, Kenai and production duo The Rudeboyz. It was also produced by Shakira and Maluma with The Rudeboyz. "Chantaje" is a pop and reggaeton song, with tropical synths in its background. The song is built from a "pitched-up vocal" saying "Hola, mira" ("Hello, look"). Lyrically, the song is a chase "between a lustful man and an unattainable woman," where "he’s not sure where he stands with her, and she's not exactly clearing things up." "Yo soy masoquista" ("I'm a masochist"), he says, and she responds, "Con mi cuerpo, un egoísta" ("With my body, an egoistic"), adding: [...] "En esta relación, soy yo la que manda" ("In this relationship, I’m in command"). In the chorus, she warns him: "No soy de ti ni de nadie" ("I'm not yours or anyone else's").

Critical reception
Jon Pareles of The New York Times was positive, noting that "Shakira gets even more intense when she sings in Spanish, nervier and more committed," and calling the song "a sparse, insinuatingly catchy reggaetón battle of the sexes." Jeff Nelson of People named it "a sexy, buoyant jam," while Diana Martin of E! Online wrote that the song is "all sorts of sexy and infectious." Lucy Morris of Digital Spy admitted: "We may have no clue what the lyrics mean, but the song is infectious." Mike Wass of Idolator opined that the song "is instantly hummable regardless of your Spanish language skills and will have you moving before the end of the first verse. It’s a winner and has the potential to be a 'La Tortura'-sized crossover hit." Lucas Villa of AXS said that the song "plays to Shakira's strengths as a global seductress with a banger that's ready to make club-goers bend to its will."

Billboard included Chantaje among the 50 essential Latin songs of the 2010s decade.

Commercial performance

In the United States, the song became the second track to ever debut atop Billboard Top Latin Songs after Shakira's and Maná's "Mi Verdad", after the chart became a multi-metric chart. With its first-week sales of 13,000 digital downloads, 1.6 million streams and 13.8 million audience impressions in the US, the song became the second highest sales week for a Spanish-language track in 2016. The single was "only the 14th track to debut atop the chart in its 30-year history"Chantaje", as reported by Billboard. It is also Shakira's eleventh number-one on the chart, and Maluma's first. "Chantaje" also debuted at number 96 on the Billboard Hot 100 chart, becoming Shakira's 19th entry there and Maluma's first. In its eighth charting week, the song managed to jump from number 65 to number 51, becoming her highest Hot 100 Spanish-language single after "La Tortura" (2005). In the same week, the song spent its eighth non-consecutive week at the top of the Latin Songs, matching the amount of time that "Hips Don't Lie" spent in 2006, while also becoming her second longest chart reign, spending eleven weeks at number one. It has been certified 16× Platinum by the RIAA's Latin certifications program, denoting sales of over 960,000 units. According to the 2017 year-end Nielsen Canada report, the song has sold 177,000 units in the country. "Chantaje" went on to become the most successful Latin single of the decade by a female artist in the United States, according to Billboard.

In the United Kingdom, the single became the first Spanish song by a female artist in history to be certified Silver for surpassing 200,000 equivalent units in the country.
 
In France, the song debuted at number 36 on the week of 11 November 2016. Later, it fell to numbers 91 and 126 in the following weeks, before climbing once again to number 76. After spending three weeks climbing on the charts, "Chantaje" cracked the top-forty for the second time, going to number forty. Five weeks later, the song managed to climb from number 22 to number 14, becoming Shakira's fifteenth top-twenty single and highest since "Dare (La La La)" (2014).

In Italy, "Chantaje" debuted at number 15 and peaked at number 11 for two weeks.

In Netherlands, "Chantaje" managed to peak at number 18, becoming her highest-charting single since "Waka Waka (This Time for Africa)" (2010).
 
In Switzerland, the song peaked at number 10, becoming Shakira's fifteenth top-ten single.
 
In Spain, "Chantaje" entered the PROMUSICAE chart at number eight and reached number-one the following week, becoming Shakira's eighth number-one single.

Music video
The music video was shot in Barcelona, on 13 and 14 October 2016, and it was directed by Spanish director and photographer Jaume de Laiguana, who has already directed various Shakira's music videos. The official lyric video to the song was released on 16 November, while the official music video was released on 18 November 2016. In the beginning of the music video, as described by Rolling Stone Sarah Grant, "Shakira strolls through a bodega with her pet pig on a leash and her wild mane of hair hidden under a pink wig." "She then lures him in to an underground bar", as Billboard added, while also "swivel[ing] her hips from the top of the bar to the men's bathroom, where she winds, kicks and grinds solo amid the urinals."

Reception
The music video earned 100 million views in just 19 days, breaking the previous 21 days record, and becoming the fastest Spanish video ever to do so. On 7 April 2017, it reached 1 billion views, becoming the fastest Spanish video to hit the billion visits landmark. It was also the second-most viewed video on Vevo in 2017, after "Despacito".

Salsa version
On 2 February, Shakira celebrated her birthday with a salsa version of "Chantaje" with Chelito de Castro.

Accolades

Live performances
To date, Shakira and Maluma have not yet  performed Chantaje together; other  than appearing in the music video itself, there are several behind-the-scenes recording studio clips on YouTube. Neither singer has made a guest appearance at the other's concerts, nor television appearances, awards show performances or otherwise.

Shakira performed Chantaje with Coldplay's lead vocalist Chris Martin at Global Citizen Festival Hamburg, on 6 July 2017. She tried to get him to sing and understand the Spanish words.

Shakira also performed a shortened, Salsa-inspired version of the song with Bad Bunny, during her medley of songs at the Super Bowl LIV halftime show.

Maluma performed the song at the Viña del Mar Festival in Valparaíso, Chile, as well as on his various tours since the song's release. He normally has a female backup vocalist "act" as Shakira and sing her lines. Likewise, Shakira has also performed the song, solo, during her El Dorado World Tour.

Credits and personnel
Credits adapted from Tidal.

Shakira – lead vocals, composer, producer
Maluma – lead vocals, composer, producer
Joel Antonio López Castro "Kenai" – composer
Kevin Mauricio Jiménez Londoño "Kevin ADG" (The RudeBoyz) – composer, producer
Bryan Snaider Lezcano Chaverra "Chan 'El Genio'" (The RudeBoyz) – composer, producer
Dave Clauss – mixing engineer
Adam Ayan – mastering engineer

Charts

Weekly charts

Year-end charts

Decade charts

All-time charts

Certifications

Release history

See also
List of number-one singles of 2016 (Spain)
List of number-one singles of 2017 (Spain)
List of number-one Billboard Hot Latin Songs of 2016
List of number-one Billboard Hot Latin Songs of 2017
List of most liked YouTube videos
List of best-selling singles in Spain

References

External links
 

2016 songs
2016 singles
Shakira songs
Maluma songs
Spanish-language songs
Songs written by Shakira
Latin pop songs
Reggaeton songs
Songs written by Maluma (singer)